WTKE (1490 AM) is a radio station licensed to Milton, Florida, United States. The station serves the Pensacola area.

References

External links

TKE
1989 establishments in Florida
Radio stations established in 1957
Sports radio stations in the United States